Monika Vana (born 14 September 1969) is an Austrian politician of The Greens-The Green Alternative, part of Parliamentary Group the  European Green Party. She is currently a Member of the European Parliament.

In parliament, Vana serves on the Committee on Budgets, the Committee on Regional Development, the Committee on Women's Rights and Gender Equality. She is a member of the delegation for relations with Australia and New Zealand as well as the United States. In addition to her committee assignments, she is a member of the European Parliament Intergroup Urban and of the European Parliament Intergroup on LGBT Rights.

References

Living people
1969 births
MEPs for Austria 2014–2019
MEPs for Austria 2019–2024
The Greens – The Green Alternative MEPs
Politicians from Vienna
21st-century women MEPs for Austria